Małgorzata Dobrowolska (born 2 June 1958, in Kamienna Góra), is a Polish-born Australian actress.

Biography
She has one brother, Janusz Dobrowolski, who also made a minor appearance in the 1984 film, Silver City.

After moving to Australia in the 1980s, Dobrowolska's first Australian film was Silver City, where she played a Polish immigrant.

Paul Cox specifically wrote the 1991 film A Woman's Tale for Sheila Florance. Directed by Cox, Dobrowolska plays a nurse who befriends an elderly woman (Florance) dying of cancer.

Filmography

FILM

TELEVISION

STAGE/THEATRE
 Hamlet (1986)
 The Marriage (1986)
 Tongue Of Stone (1995)
 Promised Land: Tinsel And Ashes, Feast (1997)

Sources 
 Stratton, D. (1990) The Avocado Plantation: Boom and Bust in the Australian Film Industry, Pan MacMillan: Sydney.

References

External links 
 

1958 births
Australian film actresses
Living people
Polish emigrants to Australia
Polish actresses